コレクション (Collection) is a compilation album released on Valbergé Recordings featuring a collection of Suicidal Tendencies recordings from their years at Epic Records. The CD-only release was packaged in a 3D folding Digipak.

Unusual for a best-of compilation album, コレクション (Collection) features only eight tracks totalling over 40 minutes in length. Like Prime Cuts and Playlist, one of Suicidal Tendencies' biggest hits, "I'll Hate You Better", is not included on this compilation album. It also omits some of their other radio hits, including "Trip at the Brain", "You Can't Bring Me Down", "Lovely", "Alone", "Monopoly on Sorrow" and "What You Need's a Friend".

Track listing

External links
 'Suicidal Tendencies - コレクション' on Valbergé Recordings' website

2013 compilation albums
Suicidal Tendencies albums